The Isla Bryson case concerns Isla Bryson, a 31-year-old Scottish transgender woman from Clydebank, Dunbartonshire, who was convicted in January 2023 of the rapes of two women that she committed prior to her gender transition.

The case caused controversy after Bryson was remanded to a women's prison to await sentence, and raised questions about women's safety following the Scottish Parliament's passage of the Gender Recognition Reform (Scotland) Bill, a piece of legislation designed to make it easier for transgender people in Scotland to change their legally recognised sex. 

Following controversy over the Bryson case, the Scottish Prison Service announced an "urgent review" into the transgender cases within its prison estate, pausing the movement of any trans prisoners while the review was in progress. After the review, it was announced that in the future, transgender prisoners would be initially accommodated according to their sex at birth while an assessment was carried out into whether it was more appropriate to house them in the male or female prison estate.

Background

Bryson states she knew she was transgender since the age of four, but did not begin the process of transitioning until the age of 29,
when facing trial for two cases of raping a woman as a biological man in 2016 and 2019. At the time of her trial she was undergoing feminising hormone therapy and seeking gender affirming surgery. She was married in 2016, after meeting her wife through a dating app, and remained married at the time of her conviction, though the wife claimed that she had been trying to divorce Bryson for seven years.

Following her arrest she initially appeared in court under a name she no longer uses, but began undergoing her gender reassignment therapy in 2020, before her trial.

Trial 
Bryson's six-day trial was held in January 2023 at the High Court of Justiciary in Glasgow. The case was prosecuted by Advocate depute John Keenan KC and defended by Edward Targowski KC, while Lord Scott sat as presiding judge. The prosecution described how Bryson had "preyed on two vulnerable female partners" after meeting them online. Bryson denied raping the two women, arguing the sex between them had been consensual, and claimed to be "in no way a predatory male". The defence also argued that Bryson's status as a person undergoing the transitioning process also made her vulnerable. Bryson was convicted of the rapes on 24 January 2023. At the time of her conviction, she was believed to be the first transgender woman in Scotland to be convicted of rape. Presiding judge, Lord Scott, warned Bryson she faced a "significant custodial sentence".

Following Bryson's conviction, Police Scotland confirmed she had been arrested and charged as a male, and that her crimes would therefore be recorded as having been committed by a man. On 28 February 2023, Bryson was sentenced to eight years in prison, with a further three years of supervision upon her release. She was also placed on the Sex Offenders Register for the rest of her life. The court heard that reports had identified Bryson as having a set of neurodevelopment problems. In his summing up, presiding judge Lord Scott said that Bryson continued to deny the crimes and had claimed her victims were colluding against her: "You see yourself as the victim in this case. But you are not [...] Your vulnerability is no excuse at all for what you did to these two women in 2016 and 2019. Regardless of your own vulnerability, in a period of just under three years, you raped two women who can both be regarded as vulnerable."

Remand to women's prison
In Scotland, the Scottish Courts and Tribunal Service (SCTS) makes the initial decision about where to accommodate a newly-convicted prisoner. Usually they are remanded to a prison near the court, and a warrant was issued for Bryson to be sent to HM Prison Barlinnie, a men's prison in Glasgow. However, the Scottish Prison Service is not bound by the warrant, and Bryson was instead remanded to HM Prison Cornton Vale in Stirling, Scotland's only prison exclusively for women, before sentencing. Other transgender women to have been held at the prison have included Katie Dolatowski, a convicted child sex offender who spent time there in 2022 after breaching a restriction of liberty order. During Bryson's time at Cornton Vale it is believed she was segregated from the other prisoners.

The Scottish Prison Service first introduced its gender identity and gender reassignment policy in 2014, after working with the Scottish Trans Alliance to develop the guidelines. The policy advises that if a person is permanently living in a gender that differs from their gender at birth, "establishment allocation should usually be the new gender in which they are living". Prisoners are assessed for accommodation on a case-by-case basis, and as of September 2022, Scotland had 15 transgender prisoners within its prisons estate, four trans men and 11 trans women. Of these, six trans women were being held in a men's prison and five in a women's prison, while one trans man was in male custody and three were in female custody. In October 2022, a Freedom of Information request obtained by The Times showed a transgender prison population of 16, half of whom had begun the transitioning process following their conviction. In December 2022, the decision to move Dolatowski to Cornton Vale led to protests outside the prison.

Safety concerns
The prospect of a convicted rapist serving a sentence in a women's prison sparked heated political debate, and concerns about the safety of the other prisoners. Sandy Brindley, the chief executive of Rape Crisis Scotland, said "It cannot be right for a rapist to be in a women's prison", while concerns were also expressed by 10 Downing Street, where a spokesman for Prime Minister Rishi Sunak compared the case with the situation in England and Wales, where "transgender women must go through a robust risk assessment that factors in their offending history and anatomy before they can be moved to a women's prison". 

Dominic Raab, the Secretary of State for Justice, said a similar incident would not happen in England and Wales, where a recent change in the law would shortly be implemented to prevent transgender women convicted of sex offences against women, or those who retained male genitalia, from being detained in a women's prison, apart from in exceptional circumstances authorised by the minister. Yvette Cooper, the Shadow Home Secretary, said "this dangerous rapist should not be in a women's prison". Keith Brown, Scotland's Cabinet Secretary for Justice, told MSPs he trusted the Scottish Prison Service to decide where Bryson should be held: "The facts of the matter are that the Scottish Prison Service has a long track record – I'm talking 20 years and more – of assessing risks within our prisons, including those presented by the presence of trans prisoners – both for the trans prisoners themselves and other prisoners." 

Bryson's conviction also came a few weeks after the Scottish Parliament had overwhelmingly passed the Gender Recognition Reform (Scotland) Bill, designed to make it easier for people in Scotland to change their legally recognised sex. The UK government subsequently announced that it would block the bill, citing among other reasons the potential for predatory men to use the legislation to access women-only spaces for malicious purposes. Nicola Sturgeon, the First Minister of Scotland, denied that the legislation would create such a risk, and accused the UK government of attacking Scottish democracy and trying to fuel a culture war. 

Attempts to amend the bill were defeated during its passage through parliament, but the resulting bill did preclude anyone with a sexual harm prevention order or sexual offences prevention order from being able to obtain a Gender Recognition Certificate. Addressing the Parliament's Equalities Committee, Lucy Hunter Blackburn of the policy analysts MurrayBlackburnMackenzie, had warned that the bill could lead to legal challenges and suggested it should be amended to exempt prisons from having to recognise the trans status of prisoners. Peter Smith of ITV News noted: "The prisons themselves could be open to legal challenges, and it is of course not just prisons tangled in this debate, but leisure centres with gendered change rooms, and also schools since the Scottish Government’s proposal would lower the age someone can change their legal gender from 18 to 16." Following Bryson's incarceration in a women's prison, the bill's opponents questioned whether it contained a sufficient level of safeguarding for women in prison.

Enrollment at Ayrshire College
In 2021, while awaiting trial, Bryson enrolled on a beauty course at Ayrshire College's Kilwinning campus, but was asked by the college to leave the course after three months because of disruptive behaviour. The course featured a combination of theory and practical work, which brought her into close contact with young female students, some as young as 16. A female student who attended the course with Bryson, described how Bryson would be present as other students undressed for practical classes such as spray tan sessions and facials, but said that she rarely participated in the practical classes herself.

Susan Smith from the campaign group For Women Scotland highlighted the ease with which Bryson could have been able to conceal her previous identity: "[She] was charged under [her] original name, and presumably they knew [her] by [her] new name, so they probably wouldn't have been able to find out anything about this person. It's absolutely terrifying that people can hide their identities and gain access to young women in this way." Thomas Ross KC noted that as the law stands a person accused of a crime does not have to disclose that information, something he described as a "catch-22 situation" for the institution, because they either face criticism for putting other students at risk by allowing the person to attend, or are open to a legal challenge from the accused for excluding them. 

Ayrshire College subsequently issued a statement confirming Bryson had been a student: "We can confirm the individual was enrolled as a student at Ayrshire College for a three-month period in 2021 and is no longer a student with the College. Ayrshire College had no prior knowledge of this individual being charged with any offences."

Move to male prison

On 26 January 2023, Nicola Sturgeon, the First Minister of Scotland, commented on the case at First Minister's Questions after the issue was raised by Conservative leader Douglas Ross. Sturgeon confirmed that Bryson would not be allowed to serve her sentence at Cornton Vale: "There is no automatic right for a trans woman convicted of a crime to serve their sentence in a female prison even if they have a gender recognition certificate. Every case is subject to rigorous individual risk assessment and the safety of other prisoners is paramount." She also confirmed the Gender Recognition Reform Bill had no bearing on the Bryson case. Bryson was moved to a male wing of HM Prison Edinburgh later the same day. It was later reported that Sturgeon had personally intervened in the case to have Bryson moved from Cornton Vale.

Rhona Hotchkiss, a former governor of Cornton Vale prison, described the decision to send a convicted rapist to a women's prison as an "unnecessary shambles".

At the 2 February session of First Minister's Questions, Sturgeon stated her opinion that Bryson is "almost certainly" faking her transgender status. She was speaking in response to a question from Douglas Ross, the leader of the Scottish Conservatives, who read a statement to parliament from one of Bryson's victims, who suggested she was faking the status as an "easy way out".

Aftermath
Following the decision to move Bryson to a male prison, speculation arose concerning a potential blanket rule on accommodating transgender prisoners after Sturgeon agreed with comments made by Brindley during an appearance on the 27 January edition of The News Agents podcast. Vic Valentine, manager of the campaign group Scottish Trans, expressed fears that introducing such a rule could put some trans women at significant risk were they to be sent to a male prison, but agreed a sex offender who poses a significant risk to women "should not be housed with women on the female estate".

Following the Bryson case, and that of Tiffany Scott, a transgender woman convicted of stalking a 13-year-old girl who had successfully applied to be transferred to a women's facility, on 29 January 2023, the Scottish Prison Service announced it would pause the movement of all transgender prisoners while it carried out an "urgent review" into all of the transgender cases within its estate. On 9 February the review concluded, and it was announced that transgender people sent to prison in Scotland would initially be housed according to their gender at birth, after which an assessment would be carried out to determine whether it would be suitable to accommodate them in a male or female facility. On the Bryson case, the report said that the Scottish Prison Service's procedures had been followed, but that the SPS had received "conflicting and limited information" about Bryson beyond the immediate convictions, and recommended a "shared justice process" for the future admission of transgender people to prison. The report also said that Bryson did not have any contact with the other prisoners during her time at Cornton Vale, and therefore did not pose a risk to them.

On 27 February 2023, regulations in England and Wales came into force banning transgender women "with their male genitalia intact", or those who are sex offenders, from being sent to women's prisons.

References

2023 in British law
2023 in LGBT history
2023 in Scotland
2023 in women's history
2020s trials
Crime in Glasgow
High Court of Justiciary cases
January 2023 events in the United Kingdom
February 2023 events in the United Kingdom
LGBT history in the United Kingdom
Prisoners and detainees of Scotland
Rape in Scotland
Rape in the 2010s
Trials in Scotland